"Leave Before the Lights Come On" is a song by English indie rock band Arctic Monkeys. The song was released on 14 August 2006 as the band's third single in the United Kingdom. The song was not included on the band's debut album Whatever People Say I Am, That's What I'm Not, though Alex Turner has stated that it could have been on the album as it follows a similar theme to many of the album tracks. It was the band's final release before promotion began for their second album Favourite Worst Nightmare in spring 2007. 

"Leave Before the Lights Come On" entered the UK Singles Chart at number four on 20 August 2006, becoming their first single not to top the chart. It did, however, reach number one on the Scottish Singles Chart, becoming their third consecutive number-one in that region. The single was the Arctic Monkeys' first single to enter the Canadian Singles Chart, debuting at number two behind Eva Avila's "Meant to Fly" by only 15 copies. It descended to number three in its second week and remained on the chart for seven weeks. The song also reached the top 20 in Denmark and Ireland.

Background
The single's release was confirmed on the band's website on 6 July 2006 and that the track would be released on 14 August as a three-track CD and a two-track 7-inch vinyl. The website did not offer any further information, but NMEs website announced that the two B-side tracks for the single will be covers, "one of which will be their version of an old song and the other a cover of a track by one of their favourite groups." In July 2006, it was confirmed on Gonzo that "Put Your Dukes Up, John" by The Little Flames would be one of the cover versions. On 17 July, it emerged on an Arctic Monkeys fan site that the other cover version would be "Baby, I'm Yours" originally recorded by Barbara Lewis. The official website soon confirmed this and added that the track would be a collaboration with the 747s.

Alex Turner confirmed the release of the single in an interview with NME: "'Leave Before the Lights Come On' feels very much like it could be on the album. So we're going to put that out as a single. I remember it's the last song that I wrote about that sort of time, going out and that. My life's not really like that any more."

This is the first single to feature Nick O'Malley on bass following the departure of Andy Nicholson, which was announced on 20 June 2006.

Music video
The video was released on the band's website on 3 August 2006. It was directed by John Hardwick, who was also at the helm for the video for "M.O.R." for the band Blur. The video was filmed in Sheffield in the Cultural Industries Quarter in July 2006 and features actors Kate Ashfield of Shaun of the Dead fame and Paddy Considine of The World's End and Hot Fuzz fame. The video starts off with Ashfield on the top of a building (the Showroom Cinema) about to jump off. She drops her shoe as Considine is walking in the street below. He sees Ashfield and immediately runs to the top of the building. He puts out his hand then he and Ashfield hug. The two walk to nearby cafe and sit down to have coffee. Ashfield makes an attempt to kiss Considine. He stops her, showing his wedding ring, then walks out of the cafe but she makes an attempt to follow him. He gets her up against a fence and threatens her before walking off. Ashfield then runs back up to the top of the building where she purposely drops her shoe in front of an unsuspecting Matt Helders, strolling along in a T-shirt with the words 'Bang, Bang' on it, a recording company for the Arctic Monkeys, implying the events to be repeated cyclically.

Credits
 Kate Ashfield
 Paddy Considine
 Matt Helders
 Alex Turner
 Directed by: John Hardwick
 Directed of Photography: Danny Cohen
 Writers: John Hardwick & Paddy Considine
 Editor: Owen Oppenheimer
 Production Company: Warp x Films

Track listings

PersonnelArctic Monkeys Alex Turner – lead and backing vocals, lead and rhythm guitar
 Jamie Cook – lead and rhythm guitar
 Nick O'Malley – bass, backing vocals
 Matt Helders – drums, backing vocalsAdditional musicians on "Baby I'm Yours"'
 Oisin Leech – lead and backing vocals, Spanish guitar
 The 747s – backing band
Ned Crowther – backing vocals
The Heritage Orchestra – strings 
Massimo Signorelli – percussion, finger snaps, hand claps, tammorra

Charts and certifications

Weekly charts

Year-end charts

Certifications

Release history

References

2006 singles
2006 songs
Arctic Monkeys songs
Domino Recording Company singles
Number-one singles in Scotland
Songs written by Alex Turner (musician)